Victor Jurisevic (born September 9, 1941) is a Yugoslavian former footballer who played as a forward.

Career 
Jurisevic played in the Yugoslav First League in 1966 with Sloboda Tuzla, and later with NK Istra 1961. The following season he played abroad in the National Soccer League with Windsor Teutonia where he recorded 29 goals. He featured in the O' Keefe Trophy final against Hamilton Primos, and scored the winning goal to secure the title for Windsor. In 1968, he signed with Detroit Cougars of the North American Soccer League. Unfortunately he failed to make an appearance for Detroit as he was released during training camp.

In May, 1968 he signed with league rivals Toronto Falcons, and made his debut against New York Generals. In his debut season in the North American Soccer League he recorded six goals. He was also selected as a guest player for the NSL All-Star team in 1968 against the Canadian national team in a friendly match. In early 1969, he played in the German-American Soccer League with Greek American AA. For the remainder of the 1969 season he returned to the National Soccer League to sign with Toronto Croatia, and played three seasons with the club. In 1974, he played in the National Soccer League of Chicago with Chicago Croatian, and featured in the 1974 National Challenge Cup.

References  

1941 births
Living people
Yugoslav footballers
Yugoslav expatriate footballers
Bosnia and Herzegovina footballers
Toronto Falcons (1967–68) players
Greek American AA players
Toronto Croatia players
Yugoslav First League players
Canadian National Soccer League players
North American Soccer League (1968–1984) players
National Soccer League (Chicago) players
Sportspeople from Tuzla
German-American Soccer League players
Association football forwards
Expatriate soccer players in Canada
Yugoslav expatriate sportspeople in Canada
Expatriate soccer players in the United States
Yugoslav expatriate sportspeople in the United States